Sirje Tamul (born 31 August 1951 in Viljandi) is an Estonian historian and a lector at the University of Tartu. She received her PhD in 2007.

Tamul's main field of research is the history of the University of Tartu between the 19th and the beginning of the 20th century. She researches the history of science, especially science at the University of Tartu; the history of education, the history of universities, the history of female students, donations and non-budgetary finance of the University of Tartu.

Tamul’s dissertation was titled Donations to the Imperial University of Tartu (1802–1918).

Works 

"G. P. Oettigen: 22. nov. 1824-16. veebr. 1916: [ülikooli rektor 1868-1876, Tartu linnapea, silmaarst]", in: Tähtpäevakalender, 21 February 1986
"Täna on eestikeelse ülikooli 76. aastapäev", in: Universitas Tartuensis, 1 December 1995, S. 3.
Album rectorum Universitatis Tartuensis 1632-1997. Tartu: Tartu Ülikooli Kirjastus 1997 
"Konfession und nationale Herkunft der Studentinnen an den Höheren Schulen in Tartu/Dorpat (1905–1918)", in: Nordost-Archiv, Lüneburg, Band VII: 1998, H. 2, S. 555
Vita academica, vita feminea: artiklite kogumik, Tartu: Tartu Ülikooli Kirjastus 1999 
Sigilla Universitatis Tartuensis, in: Ajalooline Ajakiri, 1999, S. 9-22.
"About the Mentality the academic and higher education of woman in the turn of the century", in: Historiae scientiarum Baltica 99. Abstracts of the XIXth Baltic conference of the History of science: Vilnius, Lithuania; 15–17 January 1999.  Kaunas, Vilnius: International Union of the History and Philosophy of Science., 1998, (I), S. 53-54
"Salongist...ülikooli", in: Horisont, 2000, 3/30.
"Zur Studentenschaft der russifizierten Universität Tartu 1883-1918", in: Jahrbuch für Universitätsgeschichte (JbUG), 04/2001, S. 102ff.
"Die Privatuniversität von M. I. Rostovcev 1908-1920: die Fachhochschule in Tartu?", in: Historiae scientiarum Baltica. Tartu, 2001, S. 51-52.
"Kõrgema tütarlaste- ja naishariduse algusest", in: Eesti Akadeemiliste Naiste Ühing 1926–1940, Tartu: Tartu Ülikooli Kirjastus, 2001, S. 11-17.
"Über die Studentenschaft der russifizierten Tartuer Universität (1883–1918)", in: Universitätsgeschichte in Osteuropa, Stuttgart: Franz Steiner Verlag, 2001, S. 102-111.
"Donatsioonid Tartu ülikoolile aastatel 1802-1918", in: Ajalooline Ajakiri, 2002, S. 177-192.
"Stipendiumid ja teaduskapitalid Tartu ülikoolis aastatel 1802–1918", in: Kleio, 2002 1/2.
"200 aastat õppetoetusi Tartu ülikoolis", in: Tartu ülikooli Sihtasutus aastatel 1997–2002,  Tartu Ülikooli Sihtasutus, 2002, S. 65-69.
"Veel kord Tartu ülikooli taasavamise ja eesti keele lektori küsimusest", in: 200 aastat eesti keele ülikooliõpet: 1803 eesti ja soome keele lektoraat Tartu ülikoolis: juubelikogumik, Tartu, 2003.
"Saksa oftalmoloog Arthur Bernhard Brückner", in: Õpetatud Eesti Seltsi aastaraamat. Tartu, 2004, S. 59-66.
"The nominal value of the student of the Imperial University of Tartu", in: Rossija i Baltija. Ostzejskie guberni i Severo - Zapadnyj kraj v politike reform Rossijskoj imperii. 2-ja polovina XVIII v. - XX v. 2004, S. 72-91.
"Testimonium paupertatis - vaesustunnistus, üliõpilase sotsiaalse päritolu peegel", in: Tartu Ülikooli ajaloo küsimusi. Tartu, 2004, 33, S. 84-102.
"Die Bedeutung des Krieges für die Universität Jur'ev: Schließungsabsichten und Evakuierungsmaßnahmen (1915-1918)", in:  (Hrsg.): Kollegen - Kommilitonen - Kämpfer. Europäische Universitäten im Ersten Weltkrieg. Stuttgart: Franz Steiner Verlag, 2006 (Pallas Athene Band 18) 
"Elise Käer-Kingisepp", in: A Biographical Dictionary of Women's Movements and Feminisms: Central, Eastern, and South Eastern Europe, 19th and 20th Centuries. Budapest, New York: CEU Press. S. 200-204. 
"Lilli (Caroline) Suburg", in: A Biographical Dictionary of Women's Movements and Feminisms: Central, Eastern, and South Eastern Europe, 19th and 20th Centuries. Budapest, New York: CEU Press. S. 544-547.
"Vera Poska-Grünthal", in: A Biographical Dictionary of Women's Movements and Feminisms: Central, Eastern, and South Eastern Europe, 19th and 20th Centuries. Budapest, New York: CEU Press. S. 450-454.
"Immatrikuleerumisest habiliteerumiseni: jooni akadeemilisest naisharidusest Saksamaal 1908-1918", in: Tartu Ülikooli ajaloo küsimusi. Tartu, 2006, 35, S. 53-65. .

References

Historians of science
Historians of Estonia
Estonian feminists
20th-century Estonian historians
1951 births
Academic staff of the University of Tartu
Living people
People from Viljandi
Feminist writers
Estonian women historians
21st-century Estonian historians
20th-century Estonian women writers
21st-century Estonian women writers